Kick the Dust Up Tour was the third headlining concert tour by American country music singer Luke Bryan, in support of his albums Spring Break...Checkin' Out (2014), and Kill the Lights (2015). It began on May 8, 2015,in Grand Forks, North Dakota and finished on October 30, 2015, at Ford Field in Detroit, Michigan. This tour began the day after his previous tour ended. The tour was the eighth ranked North American tour of 2015, and grossed $71.5 million in revenue.

Background
The tour was first announced in January 2015. Supporting Bryan were fellow country music artists Florida Georgia Line, Randy Houser, Dustin Lynch, Thomas Rhett and DJ Rock.

Concert synopsis
The show begins with Bryan being risen up from a platform under a circular stage while singing the opening number, "Kick the Dust Up". Bryan's concert attire consists of a ball cap, T-shirt, and black jeans. When covering Maroon 5's "Sugar", supporting acts Randy Houser and Dustin Lynch were brought up stage to perform it with Bryan. The setlist is pretty much the same as it was on Bryan's previous tour.

Setlist

Tour dates

Festivals and other miscellaneous performances
 This concert has Florida Georgia Line, Thomas Rhett and DJ Rock added for this show ONLY.
 This concert was a part of "Farm Burough Festival".
 This concert was a part of "Country Thunder Twin Lakes".
 This concert was a part of "Bi-Mart Willamette Country Music Festival".
 This concert has Dierks Bentley and DJ Rock added for this show ONLY.

References

2015 concert tours
Luke Bryan concert tours